The FIL World Luge Championships 1995 took place in Lillehammer, Norway on 4–5 February.

The event was criticized for low spectator turnout, and accordingly, lacklustre marketing. Rudi Größwang claimed that the opening ceremony, which took place at the luge track and not in Lillehammer city, only had 5 spectators who were not competitors.

Men's singles

Women's singles

Men's doubles

Mixed team

Medal table

References

Men's doubles World Champions
Men's singles World Champions
Mixed teams World Champions
Women's singles World Champions

FIL World Luge Championships
1995 in luge
1995 in Norwegian sport
Luge in Norway
Sport in Lillehammer